This is the list of episodes for Snorks, a Belgian-American animated series produced by Hanna-Barbera Productions with SEPP International S.A., and based on the original characters created by Nic Broca.

Series overview

Episodes

Pilot (1982)
There is an unaired pilot episode of Snorks for NBC in 1982, which was not really well-known due to its total non-transmission to the public. Clips from it can be seen in a promotional spot they had for the Saturday Morning kids' block with Alvin and the Chipmunks singing, plus clips from various shows, including Snorks itself. This pilot featured two unknown Snorks (most likely background characters) that did not apparently make it into the show.

Season 1 (1984)
Season 1 is the first season of Snorks which ran thirteen episodes from September 15, 1984 ("Journey to the Source") to December 8, 1984 ("Whales Tales"). Several title cards from Season 1 were lost in syndication for some unknown reason and quite a few of the episodes are paired with a few Season 2 episodes in Boomerang reruns. In fact, some Season 1 episodes are out of order when on the Season 1 DVD. The first season had a narration opening starting off with a sailor narrating about a mythical legend about mysterious underwater sea creatures rescuing Spanish Navy Captain Ortega whose log is housed in a library at a Caribbean monastery. It was used exclusively on NBC and worldwide broadcasters of the show in 1984 and although it has never graced American television screens ever since, it can be found on the DVD.

Season 2 (1985)
Season 2 of Snorks premiered on September 14, 1985 on NBC with "Snorkitis Is Nothing to Sneeze At" and ended on November 16, 1985 with "The Backwards Snork". Several changes were made during this season aside from animation style - Allstar's voice got lower while Casey's voice got higher. The "We're the Snorks" main title theme is used. The Season 2 theme can be seen on YouTube, as well as Snorks home videos distributed by Worldvision in the 80s and the season two DVD distributed by Warner Archive. This is also the shortest season of Snorks, with only 10 episodes total.

Season 3 (1987)
Season 3 of Snorks began on September 12, 1987 on both NBC and first-run syndication with "All's Whale That Ends Whale" and ended on December 5, 1987 with "The Snorkshire Spooking". Many changes were made this season and progressed well into Season 4. Dimmy disappeared from the show for unknown reasons; however, he made cameo appearances in several episodes. Corky was introduced as a main character and Jo-Jo also became a main character. Several new villains were introduced, such as the Great Snork Nork, Bigweed and Lil' Seaweed, the latter two going on to replace Junior as the main villain(s). This was also the first (and only) season of Snorks to use digital ink and paint animation. The widely known "Come Along With the Snorks" theme song was in use and has been used in further syndication and reruns for many years. Finally, several casting changes were made - Alan Oppenheimer replaced Frank Nelson as the voice of Governor Wetworth following his death and also replaced Bob Holt as the voice of Mr. Seaworthy, who also died. Lane Raichert also took over as head writer for the show.

Season 4 (1988–89)
Season 4, the final season of Snorks began at different times on different television stations. On the USA Network, it began on September 10, 1988, with "Daffney's Not So Great Escape" and ended on January 14, 1989, with "My Dinner with Allstar". On ABC, Season 4 began on October 24, 1988, with the same first episode, and ended on December 2, 1988, with the same last episode. Dimmy still made cameo appearances throughout and Bigweed and Lil' Seaweed had bigger roles as villains. Also, every episode following "In Junior's Image" was a two-parter rather than a one-parter. The digital ink and paint animation style was abandoned and replaced with the older styles. The two differences of the fourth season animation were that the animation of the Snorks themselves were different and the animation overall was lighter than in the first and second seasons. It is also the longest season on the series, with a total of 35 episodes. The "Come Along with the Snorks" theme song was kept intact.

References

External links
 

Snorks